Harry Dym (born 1938) is a mathematician at the Weizmann Institute of Science, Israel. Dym's research interests include operator theory, interpolation theory, and inverse problems.

Dym earned his Ph.D. in 1965 from the Massachusetts Institute of Technology, under the supervision of Henry McKean.
He introduced the Dym equation, which bears his name.

Works
as editor with Bernd Fritzsche, Victor Katsnelson, and Bernd Kirstein: Topics in Interpolation Theory, Birkhäuser 1997
Linear Algebra in Action, American Mathematical Society 2007
with H. P. McKean: Fourier Series and Integrals, Academic Press 1974
with H. P. McKean: Gaussian processes, function theory, and the inverse spectral problem, Academic Press 1976, Dover 2008
 contractive matrix functions, reproducing kernel Hilbert spaces and interpolation, AMS 1989
as editor: Topics in Analysis and Operator Theory, Birkhäuser 1989
with Vladimir Bolotnikov: On boundary interpolation for matrix valued Schur functions, AMS 2006
with Damir Z. Arov: -contractive matrix valued functions and related topics, Cambridge University Press 2008

Sources
Daniel Alpay, Israel Gohberg, Victor Vinnikov (Herausgeber) Interpolation theory, systems theory, and related topics: the Harry Dym anniversary volume, Birkhäuser 2002.

References

External links 
Homepage

Living people
1938 births
Israeli mathematicians
Massachusetts Institute of Technology alumni
Academic staff of Weizmann Institute of Science